Vega Church is a parish church of the Church of Norway in Vega Municipality in Nordland county, Norway. It is located in the village of Gladstad on the island of Vega in the Vegaøyan archipelago. It is the main church for the Vega parish which is part of the Sør-Helgeland prosti (deanery) in the Diocese of Sør-Hålogaland. The white, wooden church was built in a long church style in 1863 to replace an older church. The building was consecrated on 14 July 1864 by the Bishop Carl Peter Parelius Essendrop. The church seats about 430 people.

History
The earliest existing historical records of the church date back to the year 1589, but the church was not new that year. In an inspection of the church in 1666, it was described as having a nave, choir, and entry porch. At some point, there had been an addition built on the west side of the nave that was in pretty good condition, but the rest of the church building was in poor condition. It wasn't until 1734, however, that the old church was torn down. A new timber-framed church was built on the same site as the previous building.

In 1814, this church served as an election church. Together with more than 300 other parish churches across Norway, it was a polling station for elections to the 1814 Norwegian Constituent Assembly which wrote the Constitution of Norway. This was Norway's first national elections. Each church parish was a constituency that elected people called "electors" who later met together in each county to elect the representatives for the assembly that was to meet in Eidsvoll later that year.

In 1856–1857, the old church was torn down and a new church building was constructed on the same site. Unfortunately, in January 1858, a huge storm blew through and destroyed the newly built church. The following spring, planning for a new church was begun. The present church building was completed in late 1863 and it was consecrated the following summer on 14 July 1864.

See also
List of churches in Sør-Hålogaland

References

Churches in Nordland
Vega, Norway
Wooden churches in Norway
19th-century Church of Norway church buildings
Churches completed in 1863
15th-century establishments in Norway
Norwegian election church
Long churches in Norway